The Left May or Arai River is a river in northern Papua New Guinea.

See also
List of rivers of Papua New Guinea
Left May languages

References

Rivers of Papua New Guinea